The Burrungubugge River, a perennial river of the Snowy River catchment, is located in the Snowy Mountains region of New South Wales, Australia.

Course and features
The Burrungubugge River rises below Bulls Peaks, in the Strumbo Range, within the Kosciuszko National Park. The river flows generally southeast, joined by one minor tributary before reaching its confluence with the Gungarlin River. The river descends  over its  course.

See also

 List of rivers of New South Wales (A–K)
 List of rivers of Australia
 Rivers of New South Wales
 Snowy Mountains Scheme

References

 

Rivers of New South Wales
Snowy Mountains